Padenia obliquifascia is a moth of the subfamily Arctiinae. It was described by Rothschild in 1920. It is found on Sumatra, Java and Borneo.

References

Lithosiini
Moths described in 1920